Horní Bříza is a town in Plzeň-North District in the Plzeň Region of the Czech Republic. It has about 4,100 inhabitants.

Geography
It lies in the Plasy Uplands. The Bělá Stream flows through the town.

History
The first written mention of Horní Bříza is from 1180. Around 1220, the village was donated to the Plasy Monastery. 

The appearance of Horní Bříza changed after the great fire in 1865 and also with the construction of the railway line in the years 1871–1873. However, a significant turning point did not occur until the 1880s, when kaolin was discovered here. In 1882, Johann Fitz, a prominent businessman and mining expert from Rokycany, began with its mining. In 1886, he introduced the production of ceramic goods and founded a company which maintained dominant position in the ceramics industry for hundred years.

World War II
During World War II, some death trains taking Jews, outspoken people, gypsies, intellectuals, communists and Russian prisoners travelled through Horní Bříza. It was on the route to Mauthausen concentration camp, further south on the Danube River. On 21 April 1945, a death train stopped here as the line was blocked. The station master Antonín Pavlíček intervened and organized the townspeople to cook food and bread for the about 1,000 women being taken to Mauthausen. He asked the SS to leave the people there so the town could care for them, but they refused. A townswoman gave one of the women who had just given birth her own hand-sown layette planned for her baby.

Demographics

Twin towns – sister cities

Horní Bříza is twinned with:
 Villeneuve-sur-Yonne, France

References

External links

Cities and towns in the Czech Republic
Populated places in Plzeň-North District